Thirumbi Paar may refer to:
 Thirumbi Paar (1953 film), a Tamil language film
 Thirumbi Paar (1996 film), a Tamil comedy-drama film